Jason Smogorzewski (born as Jan Smogorzewski; ; 23 August 1717 – 13 May 1779) was the "Metropolitan of Kiev, Galicia and all Ruthenia". He became the first ethnic Polish who headed the Ruthenian Church. Smogorzewski became the first metropolitan to be elected and confirmed following the Russian annexation of Polotsk where he was archbishop.

In 1731 he joined the Order of Basilians and changed from Latin-rite to Byzantine-rite.

On 31 December 1758 Smogorzewski was ordained by archbishop of Durrës Joseph Schiro (Albanian Greek Catholic Church) as a coadjutor archbishop of Polock becoming a vicar bishop of Vitebsk. On 18 July 1762 he succeeded archbishop Florian Hrebnicki.

Following the death of Leo Szeptycki on 24 May 1779, Smogorzewski served as the administrator of the metropolis. On 30 Oct 1780 he was selected as Metropolitan bishop of Kiev, Galicia, and all Ruthenia and was confirmed on 25 June 1781.

He consecrated the following bishops: Peter Bielański, Michael Stadnicki and Theodosius Rostocki.

Smogorzewski died in 1788 in Radomyshl where he started to build new metropolitan complex for the Ruthenian Church.

Notelist

References 
 Jason Smogorzewski at the catholic-hierarchy.org

1715 births
1788 deaths
Eastern Catholics from the Russian Empire
People from Nowogródek Voivodeship (1507–1795)
Metropolitans of Kiev, Galicia and all Ruthenia (Holy See)
Converts to Eastern Catholicism from Roman Catholicism
Order of Saint Basil the Great
Uniate archbishops of Polotsk